The NWA United States Women's Championship was a sporadically used women's professional wrestling championship in the National Wrestling Alliance from 1968 until 1987.

Title history

Footnotes

See also

List of National Wrestling Alliance championships
National Wrestling Alliance
Jim Crockett Promotions

References

Jim Crockett Promotions championships
National Wrestling Alliance championships
Women's professional wrestling championships